Philippe Chatel, born Philippe de Châteleux de Villeneuve-Bergemont de Duras (23 February 1948 – 19 February 2021), was a French singer-songwriter.

Career
After starting in courier of Henri Salvador, Chatel became familiar with Georges Brassens and then started writing his own songs. In 1979, he rose to worldwide fame with his writing of the comedy musical Émilie Jolie. In 1997, a second version was adapted and he directed an animated edition in 2011 with Francis Nielsen. The album for this version won Best Children's Album at the 1999 Victoires de la Musique ceremony. A performance was again adapted in 2018, with less famous actors than previously presented.

In 2016, Chatel released an album titled Renaissance, in which he expressed hope and friendship. In 2021, he was nominated to become a member of the Académie Française, but was passed over for Chantal Thomas.

In addition to his musical activities, Chatel also wrote a biography titled Brassens in 1975 and a novel in 1988 titled Il reviendra, for which he was invited to speak on the talk show Apostrophes. In 2004, he wrote the novel Le Roman d'Émilie Jolie.

Personal life
Chatel was the son of television director  and was married to Catherine Chatel, with whom he had two children, Émilie (born 1975) and Nicolas (born 1981).

In 2006, Chatel was involved in a serious accident while on a quad bike near Aix-en-Provence and spent three months in a coma. He spent some time in a wheelchair and rehabilitation, and was slightly paralyzed in his jaw for life.

Chatel died of a heart attack on 19 February 2021 in Paris, four days shy of his 73rd birthday.

Discography
Analyse (1976)
Salut au temps qui passe (1978)
Sentiments (1978)
Maquillages (1981)
Yin Yang (1982)
Peau d'âme (1984)
Anyway (1994)
Renaissance (2016)

Bibliography
Brassens (1975)
Il reviendra (1988)
Le Roman d'Émilie Jolie (2004)

Distinctions
Officer of the Ordre des Arts et des Lettres (2018)

References

1948 births
2021 deaths
French male singer-songwriters
Singers from Paris
Officiers of the Ordre des Arts et des Lettres
20th-century French male singers
21st-century French male singers